Morad Ali Kandi (also Romanized as Morād ‘Alī Kandī) is a village in Qeshlaq-e Jonubi Rural District, Qeshlaq Dasht District, Bileh Savar County, Ardabil Province, Iran. At the 2006 census, its population was 118, in 25 families.

References 

Towns and villages in Bileh Savar County